Barra dos Coqueiros is a municipality  Brazilian state of Sergipe. Its population was 30,930 (2020) and its area is 91 km².

References

Populated coastal places in Sergipe
Municipalities in Sergipe